Matthew Leifheit (born 1988) is an American photographer, writer, magazine-editor, publisher, and professor. He is based in Brooklyn, New York.

Early life and education 
Leifheit was born in 1988 and raised in Chicago, Illinois. As of 2022, only day (12) was publicly known of his exact birthdate. He attended the Rhode Island School of Design (RISD), graduating in 2011 with a Bachelor of Fine Arts degree in Photography. In 2015, Leifheit enrolled at Yale University graduating in 2017, receiving a Master of Fine Arts degree.

Publishing

MATTE Magazine
In 2010, while at RISD, Leifheit founded MATTE Magazine, a magazine platform for new ideas in photography which he edits and publishes. MATTE Magazine often features a photographer's work, a portrait of the photographer by Leifheit, and an interview of the artist conducted by Leifheit.

Vice magazine 
After graduating RISD, Leifheit was hired as photo-editor by Vice. While a photo-editor at Vice, Leifheit put a photograph by Robert Mapplethorpe on the cover of the 2014 fashion issue. In 2016, he wrote an article featuring the work of Neil Winokur, highlighting an "overlooked" photographer with work in many museum collections including Museum of Modern Art and the Metropolitan Museum of Art.

MATTE Editions 
In 2018, MATTE Editions published a monograph by Matthew Morocco titled Complicit. In 2019, MATTE Editions published Slow Morpheus, a monograph by photographer Rachel Stern.
 
In addition to editing and publishing, Leifheit has also written on art and photography for Time and Aperture.

Photographic practice 
Leifheit's photography focuses on the human figure and their lived environment; his work features a variety of locations from Fire Island, Key West, the crowds surrounding New York City's Freedom Tower, Providence, and others. In addition to his fine art photography work, Leifheit works as an assignment photographer for a variety of publications including The New York Times and The New Yorker, photographing subjects such as Vince Aletti and Mary Boone.

Exhibitions

Selected solo exhibitions 
 2012 - Matte Magazine - Printed Matter, Inc, New York City, New York
 2017 -Your Georgio, M.A.W. - 56 Henry St, New York City, New York
 2018 - Fire Island Night - Deli Gallery, New York City, New York
2019 - Nothing More American - Florence Griswold Museum, Connecticut

Selected group exhibitions

 2012 - :):):) - curated by Raphael Cohen and Bea Walling, RISD Museum, Providence, Rhode Island
 2014 - AA Bronson and Michael Bühler-Rose Present ‘The Botanica,’ Invisible Exports, New York City, New York
 2015 - FOAM Talents Exhibition 2015 - Paris Photo, Brussels, London
 2017 - The Most Beautiful Part/La Parte Mas Bella, Museo de Arte Moderno, Mexico City
 2018 - The Secret Gay Box, Tom of Finland Foundation, Los Angeles, California

Awards and recognition 

 Camera Club of New York Curatorial Fellowship, 2013
 Yale Fund for Lesbian and Gay Studies, 2016
 Beinecke Rare Book & Manuscript Library Fellowship, 2016
 Yale School of Art Richard Benson Prize, 2017

References 

 

1988 births
Living people
21st-century American photographers
American LGBT photographers
American erotic photographers
American portrait photographers
Fine art photographers
American gay artists
The New Yorker people
Nude photography
Photographers from Illinois
Rhode Island School of Design alumni
Yale School of Art alumni